Andrew Ashong is a British-Ghanaian soul singer-songwriter, DJ and record producer from Forest Hill in South London. He spent his teenage years searching for records and by 16 he was DJing and working on his own productions. Andrew Ashong has released two EPs: Flowers with Theo Parrish (2012) and the Andrew Ashong EP (2014), which moved away from the dance floor sound of Flowers and interjected more soul and jazz inspired rhythms and textures "A release less targeted to the dance floor, it instead chooses to retrospectively immerse in the ethics of true music". He also featured on "Day like This/Feel Loved" by Tony Allen and Theo Parish (2013). Paul Lester of The Guardian has compared him to Shuggie Otis, Roy Ayers, Bill Withers and Lewis Taylor in his "New Band of the Day" feature.

Releases

EPs

Awards and nominations

References 

Year of birth missing (living people)
Living people
British soul singers
Musicians from London
British DJs
British male singer-songwriters
British record producers